The Thomas and Margaret Spencer Matthews Farm is a farm located at 5916 East Gardner Line Road near Amadore, Michigan. It was listed on the National Register of Historic Places in 1995.

History
A number of farm families migrated from Ontario, Canada to this region of Michigan in the mid-1800s. Among them were Thomas and Margaret Spencer Matthews, who arrived at this location in 1848. Thomas was born in 1822, and his father, Peter, had been executed for taking part in the Rebellions of 1837–1838 against the British government. The couple built this farmhouse in 1852, as well as the nearby hay barn. They raised seven children, and continued farming until Thomas's death in 1893.

References

National Register of Historic Places in Sanilac County, Michigan
Buildings and structures completed in 1852
Historic districts in Michigan